Trans–New Guinea (TNG) is an extensive family of Papuan languages spoken on the island of New Guinea and neighboring islands ‒ corresponding to the country Papua New Guinea as well as parts of Indonesia. 

Trans–New Guinea is the third-largest language family in the world by number of languages. The core of the family is considered to be established, but its boundaries and overall membership are uncertain. The languages are spoken by around 3 million people. There have been three main proposals as to its internal classification.

History of the proposal
Although Papuan languages for the most part are poorly documented, several of the branches of Trans–New Guinea have been recognized for some time. The Eleman languages were first proposed by S. Ray in 1907, parts of Marind were recognized by Ray and JHP Murray in 1918, and the Rai Coast languages in 1919, again by Ray.

The precursor of the Trans–New Guinea family was Stephen Wurm's 1960 proposal of an East New Guinea Highlands family. Although broken up by Malcolm Ross in 2005, it united different branches of what became TNG for the first time, linking Engan, Chimbu–Wahgi, Goroka, and Kainantu. (Duna and Kalam were added in 1971.) Then in 1970, Clemens Voorhoeve and Kenneth McElhanon noted 91 lexical resemblances between the Central and South New Guinea (CSNG) and Finisterre–Huon families, which they had respectively established a few years earlier. Although they did not work out regular sound correspondences, and so could not distinguish between cognates due to genealogical relationship, cognates due to borrowing, and chance resemblances, their research was taken seriously. They chose the name Trans–New Guinea because this new family was the first to span New Guinea, from the Bomberai Peninsula of western West Irian to the Huon Peninsula of eastern PNG. They also noted possible cognates in other families Wurm would later add to TNG: Wurm's East New Guinea Highlands, Binandere in the 'Bird's Tail' of PNG, and two families that John Z'graggen would later (1971, 1975) unite in his 100-language Madang–Adelbert Range family.

In 1975, Wurm accepted Voorhoeve and McElhanon's suspicions about further connections, as well as Z'graggen's work, and postulated additional links to, among others, the languages of the island of Timor to the west of New Guinea, Angan, Goilalan, Koiarian, Dagan, Eleman, Wissel Lakes, the erstwhile Dani-Kwerba family, and the erstwhile Trans-Fly–Bulaka River family (which he had established in 1970), expanding TNG into an enormous language phylum that covered most of the island of New Guinea, as well as Timor and neighboring islands, and included over 500 languages spoken by some 2,300,000 people. However, part of the evidence for this was typological, and Wurm stated that he did not expect it to stand up well to scrutiny. Although he based the phylum on characteristic personal pronouns, several of the branches had no pronouns in common with the rest of the family, or even had pronouns related to non-TNG families, but were included because they were grammatically similar to TNG. Other families that had typical TNG pronouns were excluded because they did not resemble other TNG families in their grammatical structure.

Because grammatical typology is readily borrowed—many of the Austronesian languages in New Guinea have grammatical structures similar to their Papuan neighbors, for example, and conversely many Papuan languages resemble typical Austronesian languages typologically—other linguists were skeptical. William A. Foley rejected Wurm's and even some of Voorhoeve's results, and he broke much of TNG into its constituent parts: several dozen small but clearly valid families, plus a number of apparent isolates.

In 2005, Malcolm Ross published a draft proposal re-evaluating Trans–New Guinea, and found what he believed to be overwhelming evidence for a reduced version of the phylum, based solely on lexical resemblances, which retained as much as 85% of Wurm's hypothesis, though some of it tentatively.

The strongest lexical evidence for any language family is shared morphological paradigms, especially highly irregular or suppletive paradigms with bound morphology, because these are extremely resistant to borrowing. For example, if the only recorded German words were gut "good" and besser "better", that alone would be enough to demonstrate that in all probability German was related to English. However, because of the great morphological complexity of many Papuan languages, and the poor state of documentation of nearly all, in New Guinea this approach is essentially restricted to comparing pronouns. Ross reconstructed pronouns sets for Foley's basic families and compared these reconstructions, rather than using a direct mass comparison of all Papuan languages; attempted to then reconstruct the ancestral pronouns of the proto-Trans–New Guinea language, such as *ni "we", *ŋgi "you", *i "they"; and then compared poorly supported branches directly to this reconstruction. Families required two apparent cognates to be included. However, if any language in a family was a match, the family was considered a match, greatly increasing the likelihood of coincidental resemblances, and because the plural forms are related to the singular forms, a match of 1sg and 1pl, although satisfying Ross's requirement of two matches, is not actually two independent matches, again increasing the likelihood of spurious matches. In addition, Ross counted forms like *a as a match to 2sg *ga, so that  all counted as matches to *ga. And although  and  occur in Papuan pronouns at twice the level expected by their occurrence in pronouns elsewhere in the world, they do not correlate with each other as they would if they reflected a language family. That is, it is argued that Ross's pronouns do not support the validity of Trans–New Guinea, and do not reveal which families might belong to it.

Ross also included in his proposal several better-attested families for non-pronominal evidence, despite a lack of pronouns common to other branches of TNG, and he suggested that there may be other families that would have been included if they had been better attested. Several additional families are only tentatively linked to TNG. Because the boundaries of Ross's proposal are based primarily on a single parameter, the pronouns, all internal structure remains tentative.

The languages

Most TNG languages are spoken by only a few thousand people, with only seven (Melpa, Kuman, Enga, Huli, Western Dani, Makasae, and Ekari) being spoken by more than 100,000. The most populous language outside of mainland New Guinea is Makasae of East Timor, with 100,000 speakers throughout the eastern part of the country. Enga is the most populous Trans-New Guinea language spoken in New Guinea, with more than 200,000 speakers. Golin, Sinasina, Mid Grand Valley Dani, Kamano, and Bunaq have between 50,000 and 100,000 speakers (Galela of Halmahera, usually not classified as Trans-New Guinea, also has between 50,000 and 100,000 speakers.) All other Trans–New Guinea languages have fewer than 50,000 speakers.

The greatest linguistic diversity in Ross's Trans–New Guinea proposal, and therefore perhaps the location of the proto-Trans–New Guinea homeland, is in the interior highlands of Papua New Guinea, in the central-to-eastern New Guinea cordillera where Wurm first posited his East New Guinea Highlands family. Indonesian Papua and the Papuan Peninsula of Papua New Guinea (the "bird's tail") have fewer and more widely extended branches of TNG, and were therefore likely settled by TNG speakers after the proto-language broke up.

Ross speculates that the TNG family may have spread with the high population densities that resulted from the domestication of taro, settling quickly in the highland valleys along the length of the cordillera but spreading much more slowly into the malarial lowlands, and not at all into areas such as the Sepik River valley where the people already had yam agriculture, which thus supported high population densities. Ross suggests that TNG may have arrived at its western limit, the islands near Timor, perhaps four to 4.5 thousand years ago, before the expansion of Austronesian into this area. 
Roger Blench associates the spread of Trans–New Guinea languages with the domestication of the banana.

Classification

Wurm (1975)
The classification here follows Wurm and includes some later modifications to his 1975 proposal. 
Wurm identifies the subdivisions of his Papuan classification as families (on the order of relatedness of the Germanic languages), stocks (on the order of the Indo-European languages), and phyla (on the order of the Nostratic hypothesis). Trans-New Guinea is a phylum in this terminology. A language that is not related to any other at a family level or below is called an isolate in this scheme.

('Family-level' groups are listed in boldface)

 Oksapmin isolate
 Morwap (Elseng) isolate
 Molof isolate
 Usku isolate
 Tofamna isolate
 Eleman stock
 Purari isolate
 Kaki Ae (Tate) isolate
 Eastern Eleman family: Toaripi, Tairuma
 Western Eleman family: Opao, Orokolo, Keuru)
 Inland Gulf family
 Ipiko language
 Minanibai branch: Minanibai, Tao, Mubami, Karami, Mahigi
 Kaure stock
 Kapori isolate
 Kaure family: Kaure, Kosadle, Narau
 Kopolom family: Kimaama (Kimaghana), Riantana, Ndom
 Nimboran family: Gresi, Mlap, Kemtuik, Mekwei, Nimboran
 Mek family
 Western branch: Ketengban, Sirkai, Kinome
 Eastern branch: Una (Goliath), Eipomek, Kosarek Yale, Korupun, Dagi, Sisibna, Deibula, Sela, Nalca, Nipsan
 Northern TNG subphylum
 Border stock
 Waris family: Waris, Manem, Senggi, Punda-Umeda, Waina, Daonda, Auwe (Simog), Amanab
 Taikat family: Awyi, Taikat
 Bewani family: Ainbai, Umeda, Kilmeri, Ningera, Pagi
 Tor stock
 Sause isolate (classification uncertain)
 Mawes isolate
 Orya isolate
 Tor family: Berike, Bonerif, Dabe, Mander, Itik, Keder, Kwesten, Maremgi, Wares
 Pauwasi stock
 Eastern Pauwasi family: Yafi, Emumu
 Western Pauwasi family: Dubu, Towei
 Senagi family: Angor, Dera
 South Bird's Head stock (perhaps closest to the Timor-Alor-Pantar stock)
 South Bird's Head family: Barau, Weriagar (Kemberano), Arandai, Kokoda (Tarof), Kais (Kampong Baru), Puragi, Kaburi, Kasuweri
 Inanwatan family: Duriankere, Suabo (Inanwatan)
 Konda-Yahadian family: Konda, Yahadian
 Timor-Alor-Pantar stock (perhaps closest to the South Bird's Head stock)
 Adabe isolate
 Bunak isolate
 Fataluku isolate
 Kolana isolate
 Oirata isolate
 Maku'a (Lovaea) isolate
 Tanglapui family: Sawila, Kula 
 Alor-Pantar (family-level clade? Some on Timor)
 Makasai isolate 
 Alor branch: Kamang (Woisika), Abui, Adang, Hamap, Kabola, Kafoa, Kui, Kelon, 
 Pantar branch: Blagar, Tewa, Lamma, Nedebang, Retta, Tereweng)
 Trans-Murray superstock
 Pawaia isolate
 Teberan family: Dadibi, Folopa (Podopa)
 East Kutubuan family: Fiwaga, Foi
 Turama-Kikorian stock
 Rumu (Kairi) isolate
 Turama-Omatian family: Omati, Ikobi, Mena)
 Trans Fly-Bulaka River superstock
 Bulaka River family: Yelmek, Maklew
 Trans-Fly stock
 Moraori isolate
 Kiwaian family: Northeastern Kiwai, Arigibi, Southern Kiwai, Bamu, Morigi, Kerewo, Waboda
 Tirio family: Tirio (Makayam, Aturu), Bitur (Mutum), Baramu, Were 
 Eastern Trans-Fly family: Bine, Wipii (Gidra), Gizra, Meriam (in Torres Strait, Australia)
 Pahoturi family: Agöb (Dabu), Idi, Waia
 Morehead & Upper Maro Rivers family: 
 Yey language
 Nambu branch: Namo (Dorro), Nambo (Nambu), Neme, Namat, Nama, Nen
 Tonda branch: Blafe (Tonda), Rema, Guntai, Kunja, Arammba, Wára, Ngkâlmpw Kanum, Bädi Kanum, Sota Kanum, Smärky Kanum
 Madang-Adelbert Range subphylum
 Madang superstock 
 Rai Coast stock
 Evapia family: Asas, Dumpu, Kesawai, Sausi, Sinsauru
 Mindjim family: Anjam (Bom), Bongu, Male, Sam (Songum)
 Kabenau family: Arawum, Kolom, Siroi, Lemio, Pulabu
 Yaganon family: Yabong, Ganglau, Dumun, Saep
 Peka family: Sop (Usino), Sumau, Urigina, Danaru
 Nuru family: Uya (Usu), Ogea (Erima), Duduela, Kwato, Rerau, Jilim, Yangulam
 Mabuso stock
 Kare isolate
 Kokon family: Girawa, Munit, Kein (Bemal)
 Gum family: Amele, Bau, Gumalu, Isebe, Panim, Sihan
 Hanseman family: Baimak, Bagupi, Gal, Nobonob (Garuh), Garus, Mawan, Matepi, Mosimo, Murupi, Nake, Rempi, Rapting, Saruga, Samosa, Utu, Wamas, Silopi, Yoidik, Wagi (Kamba)
 Adelbert Range superstock 
 Pihom-Isumrud-Mugil
 Bargam (Mugil)  isolate
 Pihom stock
 Amaimon isolate
 Wasembo isolate
 Kaukombaran family: Mala (Pay), Miani (Tani), Maia (Pila, Saki)
 Kumilan family: Bepour, Mauwake (Ulingan), Moere
 Numagenan family: Bilakura, Parawen, Ukuriguma, Usan (Wanuma), Yaben, Yarawata
 Omosan family: Pal (Abasakur), Kobol (Koguman)
 Tiboran family: Kowaki, Mawak, Musar, Pamosu (Hinihon), Wanambre
 Isumrud stock
 Dimir isolate
 Kowan family: Korak, Waskia
 Mabuan family: Malas, Brem (Bunabun)
 Josephstaal-Wanang
 Josephstaal stock
 Osum (Utarmbung) isolate
 Wadaginam isolate
 Sikan family: Mum (Katiati), Sileibi 
 Pomoikan family: Anam (Pondoma), Anamgura (Ikundun), Moresada 
 Wanang stock
 Paynamar isolate
 Atan family: Atemble, Nend (Angaua)
 Emuan family: Apali (Emerum), Musak
 Brahman family: Biyom, Faita, Isabi, Tauya
 Main Section: 
 Eastern TNG subphylum 
 Binanderean stock
 Guhu-Semane isolate
 Binandere family: Ambasi, Aeka, Binandere, Baruga, Doghoro, Ewage (Notu), Gaina, Hunjara, Korafe, Mawae, Orokaiva, Suena, Yega, Yekora, Zia 
 Coral Sea Coast stock
 Dagan family: Daga, Ginuman, Dima (Jimajima), Mapena, Maiwa, Onjob, Kanasi (Sona), Turaka, Umanakaina (Gwedena)
 Goilalan family: Fuyug, Tauade, Biangai-Kunimaipa-Weri
 Koiarian family 
 Koiaric branch: Grass Koiari, Mountain Koiari, Koitabu
 Baraic branch: Barai, Ese (Managalasi), Namiae, Ömie
 Kwalean family: Humene, Uare (Kwale), Mulaha
 Manubaran family: Doromu, Maria
 Mailuan family: Bauwaki, Binahari, Domu, Laua, Mailu (Magi), Morawa
 Yareban family: Aneme Wake (Abia), Bariji, Moikodi (Doriri), Nawaru (Sirio), Yareba
 Piawi family: Hagahai (Pinai), Haruai (Waibuk)
 Central and Western TNG subphylum
 Dem isolate
 Mor isolate
 Gogodala-Suki stock 
 Suki isolate
 Gogodala family: Gogodala, Ari, Waruna
 Kayagar family: Atohwaim (Kaugat), Kayagar (Kaygir), Tamagario
 Mairasi-Tanahmerah stock 
 Tanahmerah isolate
 Mairasi family: Semimi, Mer, Mairasi, Northeastern Mairasi
 West Bomberai stock 
 Karas isolate
 West Bomberai family: Baham, Iha
Sentani family: Demta, Sentani proper: Sentani, Nafri, Tabla (Tanah Merah2)
 Wissel Lakes-Kemandoga stock 
 Damal (Uhunduni) isolate
 Ekagi family: Wolani, Moni, Ekari, Auye, Dao
 Marind stock 
 Boazi family: Kuni-Boazi, Zimakani
 Marind family: Bian Marind, Marind
 Yaqay family: Warkay-Bipim, Yaqay
 Angan family: 
 Angaatiha language
 Angan proper: Simbari, Baruya, Safeyoka, Susuami, Tainae (Ivori), Hamtai, Kawacha, Kamasa, Menya, Akoye (Lohiki), Yagwoia
 Dani-Kwerba stock 
 Lowlands (north; Kwerba-Massep)
 Isirawa (Saberi) isolate
 Massep isolate
 Samarokena isolate
 Kwerba family: Airoran, Bagusa, Kwerba (Sasawa), Trimuris, Kauwera, Kwerba Mamberamo
 Highlands (south; Dani-Ngalik)
 Wano isolate
 Dani family: Hupla, Nggem, Walak, Upper Grand Valley Dani, Lower Grand Valley Dani, Mid Grand Valley Dani, Western Dani
 Ngalik family: Nduga, Silimo, Ninia Yali, Pass Valley Ninia, Angguruk Ninia
 Finisterre-Huon stock (note: classification levels needed)
 Huon
 Kovai
 Eastern Huon: Dedua, Kube, Kâte, Borong (Kosorong), Mape, Migabac, Momare, Sene
 Western Huon: Burum (Mindik), Kinalakna, Komba, Kumokio, Mese, Nabak, Nomu, Ono, Sialum, Selepet, Timbe, Tobo
 Finisterre
 Abaga
 Erap: Finongan, Gusan, Mamaa, Munkip, Nakama, Nimi, Nuk, Nek, Numanggang, Sauk, Uri
 Gusap-Mot: Madi (Gira), Iyo (Nahu), Neko, Nekgini, Ngaing, Rawa, Ufim
 Uruwa: Nukna (Komutu), Sakam, Som, Weliki, Yau
 Wantoat: Awara, Tuma-Irumu, Wantoat (Yagawak, Bam)
 Warup: Asaro'o (Morafa), Bulgebi, Degenan, Forak, Guya (Guiarak), Gwahatike (Dahating), Muratayak (Asat), Yagomi
 Yupna: Bonkiman, Domung, Gabutamon, Ma (Mebu), Nankina, Yopno (Kewieng, Wandabong, Nokopo, Isan)
 East New Guinea Highlands stock 
 Wiru isolate
 Kenati isolate
 Kalam family: Gants, Kalam-Kobon, Tai
 Eastern (Kainantu) family
 Owenia language
 Kambaira language
 Tairora branch: Binumarien, South Tairoa, North Tairoa, Waffa
 Gapsup branch: Agarabi, Awiyaana, Awa, Gadsup, Kosena, Ontenu, Usarufa
 Central family 
 Chimbu branch: Chuave, Dom, Golin, Kuman, Nomane, Salt-Yui, Sinasina
 Hagen branch
 Melpa (Medlpa) language
 Kaugel languages: Imbongu, Mbo-Ung, Umbu-Ungu
 Jimi branch: Maring, Narak, Kandawo
 Wahgi branch: Nii, Wahgi, North Wahgi
 East-Central (Goroka) family
 Gende language
 Fore branch: Fore, Gimi
 Gahuku branch: Dano (Upper Asaro), Benabena, Alekano (Gahuku), Tokano (Lower Asaro) 
 Siane branch: Siane, Yaweyuha
 Kamono-Yagaria branch: Kamono, Inoke-Yate, Kanite, Keyagana, Yagaria
 West-Central family
 Huli language
 Enga branch: Enga, Nete, Ipili, Lembena, Bisorio
 Angal-Kewa branch: Kyaka, Angal, Angal Heneng (Katinja), Angal Enen, Samberigi (Sau), West Kewa, East Kewa, Erave
 Central and South New Guinea-Kutubuan superstock
 Fasu isolate
 Central and South New Guinea stock (Central Highlands & Arafura Coast) 
 Komyandaret language (unclassified)
 Asmat-Kamoro family: Casuarina Coast Asmat, Yaosakor Asmat, Central Asmat, North Asmat, Buruwai (Asienara), Citak, Tamnim Citak, Diuwe, Kamberau (Iria), Kamoro, Sempan
 Awin-Pa family: Aekyowm (Awin), Kamula, Pare (Pa)
 Awyu-Dumut family: 
 Sawi (Sawuy) language
 Awyu branch: Aghu-Tsakwambo (Kotogut), South Awyu (Siagha), Central Awyu, Jair Awyu, Edera Awyu, Asue Awyu (Pisa), North Awyu
 Dumut branch: Atas Mandobo (Kaeti), Bawah Mandobo, Kombai, Wambon, Wanggom
 unclassified: Korowai, North Korowai, Ketum
 Bosavi family: Aimele (Kware), Kaluli, Beami, Dibiyaso (Bainapi), Edolo, Kasua, Onobasulu, Sonia
 Duna-Bogaya family: Bogaya, Duna
 East Strickland family: Fembe (Agala), Gobasi (Nomad), Kubo, Odoodee (Tomu), Konai, Samo
 Mombum family: Koneraw, Mombum
 Momuna family: Momina, Momuna (Somahai)
 Ok family
 Tangko language
 Western branch: Burumakok, Kwer, Kopkaka
 Lowland branch: Iwur, North Muyu (Northern Kati), South Muyu (Southern Kati), Ninggerum, Yonggom
 Mountain branch: Bimin, Faiwol, Kauwol, Mian, Nakai, Setaman, Suganga, Ngalum, Tifal, Telefol, Urapmin

Foley (2003)
As of 2003, William A. Foley accepted the core of TNG: "The fact, for example, that a great swath of languages in New Guinea from the Huon Peninsula to the highlands of Irian Jaya mark the object of a transitive verb with a set of verbal prefixes, a first person singular in /n/ and second person singular in a velar stop, is overwhelming evidence that these languages are all genetically related; the likelihood of such a system being borrowed vanishingly small." He considered the relationship between the Finisterre–Huon, Eastern Highlands (Kainantu–Gorokan), and Irian Highlands (Dani – Paniai Lakes) families (and presumably some other smaller ones) to be established, and he said that it is "highly likely" that the Madang family belongs as well. He considered it possible, but not yet demonstrated, that the Enga, Chimbu, Binandere, Angan, Ok, Awyu, Asmat (perhaps closest to Ok and Awyu), Mek, Sentani, and the seven small language families of the tail of Papua New Guinea (Koiarian, Goilalan, etc., which he maintains have not been shown to be closely related to each other) may belong to TNG as well.

Ross (2005)

Ross does not use specialized terms for different levels of classification as Donald Laycock and Stephen Wurm did. In the list given here, the uncontroversial families that are accepted by Foley and other Papuanists and that are the building blocks of Ross's TNG are printed in boldface. Language isolates are printed in italics.

Ross removed about 100 languages from Wurm's proposal, and only tentatively retained a few dozen more, but in one instance he added a language, the isolate Porome.

Ross did not have sufficient evidence to classify all Papuan groups. In addition, the classification is based on a single feature – shared pronouns, especially 1sg and 2sg – and thus is subject to false positives as well as to missing branches that have undergone significant sound changes, since he does not have the data to establish regular sound correspondences.

Unclassified Wurmian languages
Although Ross based his classification on pronoun systems, many languages in New Guinea are too poorly documented for even this to work. Thus there are several isolates that were placed in TNG by Wurm but that cannot be addressed by Ross's classification. A few of them (Komyandaret, Samarokena, and maybe Kenati) have since been assigned to existing branches (or ex-branches) of TNG, whereas others (Massep, Momuna) continue to defy classification.

 Kenati (→ Kainantu?)
 Komyandaret (→ Greater Awyu)
 Massep isolate
 Molof isolate
 Momuna family (2)
 Samarokena (→ Kwerba)
 Tofamna isolate
 Usku isolate

Reclassified Wurmian languages
Ross removed 95 languages from TNG. These are small families with no pronouns in common with TNG languages, but that are typologically similar, perhaps due to long periods of contact with TNG languages.

 Border and Morwap (Elseng), as an independent Border family (15 languages)
 Isirawa (Saberi), as a language isolate (though classified as Kwerba by Clouse, Donohue & Ma 2002)
 Lakes Plain, as an independent Lakes Plain family (19)
 Mairasi, as an independent Mairasi family (4)
 Nimboran, as an independent Nimboran family (5)
 Piawi, as an independent Piawi family (2)
 Senagi, as an independent Senagi family (2)
 Sentani (4 languages), within an East Bird's Head – Sentani family
 Tor and Kwerba, joined as a Tor–Kwerba family (17)
 Trans-Fly – Bulaka River is broken into five groups: three remaining (tentatively) in TNG (Kiwaian, Moraori, Tirio), plus the independent South-Central Papuan and Eastern Trans-Fly families (22 and 4 languages).

West Trans–New Guinea linkage ? [a suspected old dialect continuum]
West Bomberai – Timor–Alor–Pantar
 Timor–Alor–Pantar families (22)
 West Bomberai family (2)
 Paniai Lakes (Wissel Lakes) family (5)
 Dani family (13)
 South Bird's Head (South Doberai) family (12)
 Tanah Merah (Sumeri) isolate
 Mor isolate
 Dem isolate
 Uhunduni (Damal, Amungme) isolate
 Mek family (13)
 ? Kaure–Kapori (4) [Inclusion in TNG tentative. No pronouns can be reconstructed from the available data.]
 Kapori isolate
 Kaure family (3)
 ? Pauwasi family (4) [Inclusion in TNG tentative. No pronouns can be reconstructed from the available data. Since linked to Karkar, which is well attested and not TNG]
 Kayagar family (3)
 Kolopom family (3)
 Moraori isolate
 ? Kiwai–Porome (8) [TNG identity of pronouns suspect]
 Kiwaian family (7)
 Porome (Kibiri) isolate
 Marind family (6)
 Central and South New Guinea ? (49, reduced) [Part of the original TNG proposal. Not clear if these four families form a single branch of TNG. Voorhoeve argues independently for an Awyu–Ok relationship.]
 Asmat–Kamoro family (11)
 Awyu–Dumut family (8–16)
 Mombum family (2)
 Ok family (20)
 Oksapmin isolate [now linked to the Ok family]
 Gogodala–Suki family (4)
 Tirio family (4)
 Eleman family (7)
 Inland Gulf family (6)
 Turama–Kikorian family (4)
 ? Teberan family [inclusion in TNG tentative] (2)
 ? Pawaia isolate [has proto-TNG vocabulary, but inclusion questionable]
 Angan family (12)
 ? Fasu (West Kutubuan) family (1–3) [has proto-TNG vocabulary, but inclusion somewhat questionable]
 ? East Kutubuan family (2) [has proto-TNG vocabulary, but inclusion somewhat questionable]
 Duna–Pogaya family (2)
 Awin–Pa family (2)
 East Strickland family (6)
 Bosavi family (8)
 Kamula isolate
 Engan family (9)
 Wiru isolate (lexical similarities with Engan)
 Chimbu–Wahgi family (17)
 Kainantu–Goroka (22) [also known as East Highlands; first noticed by Capell 1948]
 Goroka family (14)
 Kainantu family (8)
 Madang (103)
 Southern Adelbert Range–Kowan
 Kowan family (2)
 Southern Adelbert Range
 Josephstaal (7)
 Osum (Utarmbung) isolate
 Wadaginam isolate
 Sikan family (2)
 Pomoikan family (3)
 Wanang (5)
 Paynamar isolate
 Atan family (2)
 Emuan family (2)
 Faita isolate
 Rai Coast–Kalam
 Rai Coast family (31)
 Kalam family (4; perhaps part of Rai Coast)
 Croisilles linkage
Dimir-Malas (2)
Kaukombar (4)
Kumil (5)
Tibor-Omosa (6)
 Amaimon isolate
Numugen-Mabuso
Numugen family (6)
Mabuso family (29)
 Finisterre–Huon (62) [part of the original TNG proposal. Has verbs that are suppletive per the person and number of the object.]
 Finisterre family (41)
 Huon family (21)
 ? Goilalan family (6) [inclusion in TNG tentative]
 Southeast Papuan (Bird's Tail) ? [these families have not been demonstrated to be related to each other, but have in common ya for 'you[plural]' instead of proto-TNG *gi]
 Koiarian family (7)
 Kwalean family (3)
 Manubaran family (2)
 Yareban family (5)
 Mailuan family (6)
 Dagan family (9)
 Binanderean (16)
 Guhu-Samane isolate
 Binandere family (15) [a recent expansion from the north]

Pawley and Hammarström (2018)

Andrew Pawley and Harald Hammarström (2018) accept 35 subgroups as members of Trans-New Guinea.

Trans-New Guinea subgroups (strong evidence) 35 subgroups, 431 languages
Madang (107)
Finisterre-Huon (62)
Kainantu-Goroka (29)
Ok-Oksapmin (20)
Anim (17)
Chimbu-Wahgi (17)
Greater Awyu (17)
Enga-Kewa-Huli (14)
Angan (13)
Dani (13)
Greater Binanderean (13)
Asmat-Kamoro (11)
Dagan (9)
Mailuan (8)
Bosavi (7)
Koiarian (7)
Mek (7)

East Strickland (6)
Kiwaian (6)
Goilalan (5)
Paniai Lakes (5)
Yareban (5)
Gogodala-Suki (4)
Turama-Kikori (4)
Kayagaric (3)
Kolopom (3)
Kutubu (3)
Kwalean (3)
West Bomberai (3)
Awin-Pa (2)
Duna-Bogaya (2)
Manubaran (2)
Somahai (2)
Marori (isolate)
Wiru (isolate)

Groups and isolates considered by Pawley and Hammarström (2018) as having weaker or disputed claims to membership in Trans-New Guinea (some of which they suggest may ultimately turn out to be Trans-New Guinea, but further evidence is needed):
Bayono-Awbono (2)
Komolom (Mombum) (2)
Mairasi (3)
Pauwasi (5)
Pawaian (isolate)
Sentanic (4)
South Bird's Head (12)
Tanah Merah (isolate)
Teberan (2)
Timor-Alor-Pantar (20+)
Uhunduni (Damal) (isolate)

Groups and isolates sometimes classified as Trans-New Guinea, but rejected by Pawley and Hammarström (2018) as Trans-New Guinea:
Dem (isolate)
Eleman (5)
Kaki Ae (isolate)
Kamula (isolate)
Kaure-Narau (2)
Mor (isolate)
Porome (isolate)
Purari (isolate)

Glottolog 4.0 (2019)
Glottolog 4.0 (2019) accepts 10 groups as part of the Nuclear Trans–New Guinea family.

Madang (106)
Finisterre-Huon (61)
Asmat-Awyu-Ok (49)
Kainantu-Goroka (28)
Chimbu-Wahgi (17)
Enga-Kewa-Huli (14)
Dani (13)
Greater Binanderean (13)
Mek (8)
Paniai Lakes (5)

Usher (2020)

Timothy Usher has reconstructed lower-level constituents of Trans–New Guinea to verify, through the establishment of regular sound changes, which purported members truly belong to it, and to determine their subclassification. In many cases Usher has created new names for the member families to reflect their geographic location. Much of his classification is accepted by Glottolog (though his names are not, as Glottolog invents its own names). As of 2020, his classification is as follows, including correspondences to the names in earlier classifications. He expects to expand the membership of the family as reconstruction proceeds.

Berau Gulf
Mor
North Berau Gulf (= South Bird's Head)
Yabin
South Bird's Head (= nuclear South Bird's Head plus Inanwatan)
West Bomberai (incl. Timor–Alor–Pantar)
Sumuri
West Papuan Highlands (= Irian Highlands)
Amung–Dem
Amung (Uhunduni)
Dem
Balim Valley (= Dani)
Paniai Lakes
Asmat – Muli Strait
Asmat – Kamrau Bay (= Asmat–Kamoro)
Muli Strait (= Mombum)
Cook River – Kolopom
Cook River (= Kayagar)
Kolopom (incl. Moraori)
Oksap (Oksapmin)
Central West New Guinea
Digul River – Ok
Digul River (= Greater Awyu, incl. Bayono-Awbono)
Kamula – Elevala River (= Awin–Pa plus Kamula)
Ok
Momuna–Mek
Mek
Momuna
Papuan Plateau (= Bosavi, incl. Dibiyaso)
Duna–Bogaia
Abom
Fly River (Anim)
Inland Gulf
Lake Murray (= Boazi)
Lower Fly River (= Tirio)
Marind–Yakhai (= Marind)
Morobe – Eastern Highlands
Eastern Highlands (= Kainantu–Goroka)
Finisterre–Huon
Kratke Range (= Angan)
Papuan Peninsula (Southeast Papuan)
Meneao Range (= Dagan)
Owen Stanley Range
Koiari – Managalas Plateau (= Koiarian)
Humene–Uare (= Kwalean)
Mount Brown (= Manubaran)
Cloudy Bay – Musa River
Bauwaki
Cloudy Bay (= Mailuan)
Musa River (= Yareban)
These branches may cluster together (the southwestern branches, for example, may group together), but the details are as yet unclear.

The families from the Ross and Glottolog classifications that are not included are Kaure, Pauwasi, Engan, Chimbu–Wahgi, Madang, Eleman, Kiwaian, Binanderean, Goilalan, and the several Papuan Gulf families. Usher only includes families that have a regular reflex of the 2sg pronoun, so there may be additional TNG families that have changed their pronouns.

Dryer (2022)
According to Dryer (2022), evidence for membership in Trans-New Guinea based solely on pronouns and 'louse' is not considered to be sufficient, since they are more likely to be widespread areal lexical forms (Wanderworts).

Matthew Dryer's (2022) preliminary evaluation of Pawley and Hammarström (2018), which he had based on his preliminary quantitative analysis of data from the ASJP database, suggests that the following language groups are likely to be Trans–New Guinea (listed in order of highest to lowest score, i.e. starting from the most likely group):

Madang
Chimbu–Wahgi
Awyu–Ok
Enga–Kewa–Huli
Kiwaian
Finisterre–Huon
Dagan
Yareban
Wiru
Bayono–Awbono
Paniai Lakes
Turama–Kikorian
Kainantu–Goroka

Dani
Angan
Somahai
East Strickland
Koiarian
Fuyug
Fasu
Gogodala–Suki
Damal
Manubaran
Anim
Greater Binanderean

On the other hand, Pawley and Hammarström (2018) do not consider Bayono–Awbono and Damal to be Trans–New Guinea subgroups.

"Borderline" groups that show somewhat more similarities with "Trans–New Guinea" than other non-Trans–New Guinea groups:

Bosavi
Goilalan
South Bird's Head
Timor–Alor–Pantar
Fasu
Bogaya
Teberan

South Bird's Head, Timor–Alor–Pantar, and Teberan are not considered by Pawley and Hammarström (2018) to be Trans–New Guinea subgroups.

The following groups display few Trans–New Guinea basic vocabulary items and are hence less likely to be Trans–New Guinea:

Mailuan
Duna
Asmat–Kamrau Bay
Kwalean
Kolopom
West Bomberai
Mek
Elevala
Moraori
Kayagaric
Mulaha

However, Dryer (2022) notes that this preliminary quantitative analysis only gives a rough estimate of the groups that may or may not belong within Trans–New Guinea, and that similarities may be due to loanwords, areal influences, and so forth.

Lexical semantics
A number of colexification patterns (called 'semantic conflations' by Donald Laycock), particularly in the nominal domain, are commonly found among Trans–New Guinea languages:
[man, husband]
[woman, wife]
[bird, bat]
[hair, fur, feather, leaf]
[tree, firewood, fire]
[water, river]
[bark, skin of animal, peel or skin of fruit]
[bark, skin, body]
[egg, fruit, seed; some other round objects, e.g. kidney, eye, heart]
[hand, foreleg of quadruped, wing]
[heart, seat of emotions]
[blood, red]
[garden, work], [to make gardens, to work]
[joint, elbow, knee]
[milk, sap, semen, white of egg, bone marrow]
[nose, face]
[teeth, internal mouth]
[leg, foot, hindleg]
[finger, toe]
[father, owner; mother, owner]

Proto-language

See also

Indo-Pacific languages
Proto-Trans-New Guinea reconstructions (Wiktionary)

References

Bibliography

External links
TransNewGuinea.org - database of the languages of New Guinea (by Simon Greenhill)
Timothy Usher's Newguineaworld site

 
Proposed language families
Language families
Languages of Indonesia
Languages of Papua New Guinea
Papuan languages